James William Cockshutt (1872 – 13 April 1938) was an English professional footballer who played as a forward.

References

1872 births
1938 deaths
People from Darwen
English footballers
Association football forwards
Blackburn Rovers F.C. players
Brierfield F.C. players
Burnley F.C. players
Nelson F.C. players
Reading F.C. players
Grimsby Town F.C. players
English Football League players